Arribes is a Spanish Denominación de Origen Protegida (DOP) for wines located in the southeast of the province of Zamora and the northeast of the province of Salamanca (Castile and León, Spain), along the border with Portugal on the banks of the River Duero.

In 2002 the area covered by the DOP along with parts of Portugal on the opposite bank was declared a Natural Park, Parque Natural de Arribes del Duero.

History
There are two theories regarding the origins of winemaking in the Arribes region. The first says that it was the ancient Romans who introduced grape-growing and wine-making. The second theory says it could have been the Phoenicians at a much earlier date, making use of their fleets along the Duero and the port of Oporto.

In 1998, the area was awarded the category of Vino de la Tierra and on 27 July 2005, it was awarded the higher category of Denominación de Origen.

The name Arribes derives from the Latin ad ripam, which means 'on the banks' (of the river Duero).

Climate
The area enjoys a Mediterranean climate with Atlantic influences. Rainfall is evenly spread over the year. Summers tend to be warm and dry while winters are mild.

Soils
The soils are not deep, mostly sandy with loose granite and quartz pebbles. There are many rocky outcrops and the soil is generally poor in organic matter.

The subsoil provides good drainage, and an interesting heat regulation mechanism. The presence of slate in the subsoil acts as a heat accumulator during the day and releases it slowly during the night.

Vineyards
The authorized planting density is a minimum of 2,000 vines/hectare; the maximum authorized yield id 10,000 kg/ha for white varieties and 7,000 kg/ha for red varieties.

The vines are mostly old vines (65 years on average) and so are mostly grown as low bushes (en vaso), though recently planted ones tend to be on trellises (en espaldera). Average yield is 3,500 kg/ha, or about 1.5 kg/vine.

Grape varieties
The authorized red varieties are: Tempranillo (known as Tinta Serrana or Tinto Madrid locally), Juan García, Rufete, Garnacha Tinta, Mencía, Bruñal / Albarín Tinto

The authorized white varieties are: Malvasía Castellana / Doña Blanca, Albillo Mayor, Albillo Real, Verdejo.

Wines produced
 Tinto joven (young reds): made mainly with Jaun García, Rufete and Tempranillo
 Tinto Crianza (oak aged reds): at least 6 months in oak, plus 18 months in bottle
 Rosado (rosé): at least 60% Juan García, Rufete and Tempranillo
 Blanco (white): at least 60% Malvasía

References

External links
 D.O. Arribes official website

Wine regions of Spain